Thiopeptides (thiazolyl peptides) are a class of peptide antibiotics produced by bacteria.  They have antibiotic activity against Gram-positive bacteria, but little or no activity against Gram-negative bacteria.  Many of the members of this class show activity against methicillin-resistant Staphylococcus aureus (MRSA) and are therefore subjects of research interest.

There are over 100 members of this class known.


Chemical structure
Thiopeptides are sulfur-rich macrocyclic peptides containing highly-modified amino acids.  They are characterized by a nitrogen-containing six-membered ring (such as piperidine, dehydropiperidine, or pyridine) substituted with multiple thiazole rings and dehydroamino acids.  A macrocylic ring serves as a scaffold for a tail that also incorporates modified amino acids often with azole rings, such as thiazoles, oxazoles, and thiazolines which are derived from serine, threonine, and cysteine residues.

Examples
Examples of thiopeptides include thiostrepton, cyclothiazomycin, nosiheptide, and lactocillin.

References